Charlotte Ancher Gardner (November 14, 1931 – June 10, 2020) was an American politician and educator.

Gardner was born in Baltimore, Maryland. She moved with her family to Rockwell, North Carolina and graduated from Rockwell High School. Gardner graduated from Catawba College. She taught high school and lived in Salisbury, North Carolina with her husband and family. Gardner served in the North Carolina House of Representatives from 1985 to 2001 and was a Republican. Gardner died in Kannapolis, North Carolina.

Notes

1931 births
2020 deaths
Politicians from Baltimore
People from Salisbury, North Carolina
Catawba College alumni
Schoolteachers from North Carolina
American women educators
Women state legislators in North Carolina
Republican Party members of the North Carolina House of Representatives
21st-century American women